Criminal Activity is the debut album by American rap supergroup Criminalz, which consisted of Spice 1, Celly Cel and Jayo Felony. It was released on August 7, 2001 via Celly Cel's label, Realside Records. Cel also served as executive producer and audio production of the record was handled by Doyle, G-Man Stan and Spice 1. It peaked at number 57 on the Billboard Top R&B/Hip-Hop Albums and number 26 on the Billboard Independent Albums. The album features guest performances by Yukmouth, Tray Dee, Sylk-E. Fyne and Bun B.

One song, "Boss Up", was previously released on the Spice 1 compilation, The Playa Rich Project.

Critical reception 

Allmusic - "Everyone was expecting a lot from this group from the first time it was mentioned...For many reasons this just doesn't work...It seems like they all wrote their verses independently of one another, then rapped in whatever order they felt like it. There's no fluid feel...as a whole this definitely falls short of any of their solo work."

RapReviews - "...Most rap groups who made great albums needed guidance to make those great albums. The Criminalz definitely lack a mastermind to weld the three of them together and make them realize their synergies...There are almost no ad-libs, there's no interacting, it might as well be that these three never were in the same studio together..."

Track listing

Chart history

Personnel 
 Bernard Freeman – performer (track 5)
 Doyle – producer (tracks: 4-6, 8-10, 12)
 "G-Man" Stan Keith – producer (tracks: 2-3, 11), mixing & recording
 James Savage – performer (tracks: 3-4, 6-7, 9-11)
 Jerold Dwight Ellis III – performer (track 7)
 Joi Patrice - background vocals (track 6)
 J.R. - background vocals (tracks: 8, 10)
 La'Mar Lorraine Johnson – performer (track 8)
 Marcellus McCarver – performer (tracks: 2-6, 8-12), executive producer
 Robert Lee Green, Jr. – performer (tracks: 3-12), producer (track 7)
 Tracy Lamar Davis – performer (track 7)

References

External links 
 [ Criminal Activity] at Allmusic
 Criminal Activity at Discogs
 Criminal Activity at MusicBrainz
 Criminal Activity at Tower Records

Spice 1 albums
Celly Cel albums
2001 debut albums
Criminalz albums
Jayo Felony albums